Myagrum, muskweed or musk weed, is a genus of flowering plants in the family Brassicaceae. It has only one species, Myagrum perfoliatum, native to Europe and the Middle East, and an introduced weed in North America, South America, Australia and other places in Asia. It is sister to Isatis.

Species
Presently only one species is considered valid, Myagrum perfoliatum. A large number of species names have been previously associated with Myagrum. 

Myagrum aegyptiacum Panz.
Myagrum aegyptium L.
Myagrum alpinum Lapeyr.
Myagrum alyssum Mill.
Myagrum americanum Larrañaga
Myagrum amphibium (L.) Loisel.
Myagrum amplexicaule Moench
Myagrum aquaticum Lam.
Myagrum arborescens Jacq.
Myagrum argenteum Pursh
Myagrum armeniacum Steud.
Myagrum asperum Poir.
Myagrum auriculatum DC.
Myagrum austriacum (Crantz) Jacq.
Myagrum balearicum (L.) Lam.
Myagrum bauhinii C.C.Gmel.
Myagrum biarticulatum Crantz
Myagrum bienne Chaix
Myagrum bursifolium Thuill.
Myagrum chlorifolium Willd.
Myagrum clavatum Lam. [Illegitimate]
Myagrum clavatum Poir. [Illegitimate]
Myagrum cornutum L.
Myagrum coronopus (L.) Crantz
Myagrum crantzii Vitman
Myagrum dentatum Willd.
Myagrum erucaefolium Vill.
Myagrum erucago Lam.
Myagrum erucago Crantz
Myagrum erucifolium Vill.
Myagrum erucoides Pourr. ex Willk. & Lange
Myagrum foetidum Bergeret [Invalid]
Myagrum glabrum Gilib.
Myagrum grandiflorum Banks ex DC.
Myagrum hierochunticum (L.) Crantz
Myagrum hispanicum L.
Myagrum iberioides Brot.
Myagrum irregulare Asso
Myagrum littorale Scop.
Myagrum monospermum Forssk.
Myagrum montanum Jean-Pierre Bergeret
Myagrum natans Patrin ex DC.
Myagrum orientale L.
Myagrum palustre (L.) Lam.
Myagrum paniculatum L.
Myagrum perenne L.
Myagrum pinnatifidum Ehrh. ex DC.
Myagrum pinnatum Sol.
Myagrum procumbens Pourr.
Myagrum × prostratrum Bergeret
Myagrum prostratum Bergeret
Myagrum prostratum J. P. Bergeret
Myagrum pumilum Lam.
Myagrum pyrenaicum (All.) Lam.
Myagrum rigidum Pall.
Myagrum rostratum Scop.
Myagrum rugosum L.
Myagrum sativum L.
Myagrum saxatile (L.) L.
Myagrum sphaerocarpum Jacq.
Myagrum spinosum (L.) Lam.
Myagrum stylosum Gochnat ex DC.
Myagrum syriacum Lam.
Myagrum syriacum Crantz
Myagrum taraxacifolium Lam.
Myagrum tataricum Poir.
Myagrum utriculatum (L.) Bergeret ex DC.
Myagrum venosum Pers.
Myagrum verrucosum Lam.

References

Brassicaceae
Monotypic Brassicaceae genera
Plants described in 1753
Taxa named by Carl Linnaeus